The Ruins is the remains of the ancestral home mansion of the family of Don Mariano Ledesma Lacson and Maria Braga Lacson. It is situated in Talisay, Negros Occidental, Philippines. The mansion was built in early 1900s and inspired by Italian architecture.

History

The Ruins was the ancestral mansion of the family of wealthy sugar businessman Don Mariano Ledesma Lacson built on a 440 hectare sugar plantation in Talisay City, Negros Occidental, in the early 1900s in memory of his Portuguese wife Maria Braga Lacson, who died during the birth of their 8th child. During the Second World War, Filipino guerillas burned it down as a countermeasure to prevent the invading Japanese forces from using it as a military headquarters. It burned for three days. The intention was to burn it to the ground.

Current status
Known variously as the "Taj Mahal of Talisay", "Taj Mahal of Negros" and "Taj Mahal of the Philippines", it is in the private ownership of the great-grandchildren of Don Mariano Ledesma Lacson and Cora Maria Osorio Rosa-Braga. They have preserved it in its ruined state, among operational farmland, as a tourist attraction that can be visited for a fee or hired for events. It is open to daily visitors from 8am to 8pm for am entrance fee of PHP100 for adults, PHP 50 for students and PHP20 for children.

See also
 Taj Mahal of India
 Balay Negrense
 Hacienda Rosalia
 Silliman Hall
 Dizon-Ramos Museum
 Museo Negrense de La Salle
 Dr. Jose Corteza Locsin Ancestral House

References

Buildings and structures in Negros Occidental
Tourist attractions in Negros Occidental